Rodovia Régis Bittencourt (official designation in the state of São Paulo SP-230) is a section of the BR-116 that connects the cities of Taboão da Serra and Rio Negro, passing also through Curitiba, Brazil. It is considered one of the most dangerous highways of Brazil, due to the high number of accidents. Sometimes it is even nicknamed "Rodovia da Morte" (Death Highway). It also leads the number of ambiental accidents in the state of São Paulo.

Duplication
Régis Bittencourt was, for the most part, duplicated around the year 2000. However, there was a stretch on a simple track, 19 km long, in the mountain region between Miracatu and Juquitiba, called Serra do Cafezal, in the state of São Paulo. In this stretch, the heavy traffic of heavy cargo vehicles (corresponding to up to 60% of the total), the rugged topography and poor conservation, have been causing increasing traffic jams and fatal accidents, being one of the highways with the highest rate of accidents with fatalities.

As of 2008, long negotiations dragged on between the concessionaire and IBAMA on the route with the least environmental impact and the lowest cost of carrying out the duplication of the most rugged topography stretch Serra do Cafezal, until the final project was released. After protests by the Brazilian population, the concessionaire began the duplication works of Serra do Cafezal, also known as "Serra dos 90", in 2010. The first duplicated sections were partially delivered between 2012 and 2015. The works were fully concluded in December 2017, after bureaucratic obstacles involving environmental licenses.

Photos

See also 
 Highway system of São Paulo
 Brazilian Highway System

References 

Highways in São Paulo (state)
Federal highways in Brazil